John Richard Evans (born August 5, 1949 in Los Angeles) is an American retired slalom canoeist who competed from the late 1960s to the mid-1970s. He finished 14th in the C-2 event at the 1972 Summer Olympics in Munich.

References
Sports-reference.com profile

1949 births
American male canoeists
Canoeists at the 1972 Summer Olympics
Living people
Olympic canoeists of the United States